Nagayev or Nagaev (feminine: Nagayeva, Nagaeva) is a Russian-language family name, derived from the obsolete Russian ethnonym 'Nagay' for Nogais.

The surname may refer to:

Alexey Nagayev (1704-1781), Russian hydrographer and admiral
Igor Nagayev
Ivan Nagaev
Ruslan Nagayev
, a Hero of the Soviet Union

Russian-language surnames